Francisco Manuel Lopes Vieira de Oliveira Dias (17 February 1930 – 14 January 2019) was a Portuguese politician.

Background
He was son of Francisco António do Amaral Dias, a Medical Doctor, and wife Maria Isabel Charters Lopes Vieira da Câmara de Oliveira (b. 1904), of English descent, related to the 1st Viscounts of São Sebastião.

Career
He was a collaborator of the Founders of then Democratic and Social Center (CDS), and occupied many offices in this Party.

In 1974 he was elected a Deputy to the Constituent Assembly and in 1976 to the Assembly of the Republic, where he was successively elected until 1983.

He was the 4th President of the Assembly of the Republic between 22 October 1981 and 2 November 1982, during which he was also a Member of the Portuguese Council of State.

He was also a Member of the Parliamentary Assembly of the European Council and of its Commission of Education and Culture.

He died on 14 January 2019, aged 88.

Family
He married Maria das Mercês Coelho da Silva Gil, daughter of Adelino da Silva Gil (Figueira da Foz, Alhadas, 27 October 1885 - Lisboa, 25 June 1935) and wife Deolinda Duarte Coelho (Vouzela, Vouzela, 1 March 1887 - Lisbon, 26 September 1955), and had eleven children:
 Maria Isabel Gil de Oliveira Dias
 Francisco Maria Gil de Oliveira Dias
 Paulo Gil de Oliveira Dias
 João Manuel Gil de Oliveira Dias
 José Pedro Gil de Oliveira Dias
 Maria das Mercês Gil de Oliveira Dias
 Nuno Gil de Oliveira Dias
 Miguel Gil de Oliveira Dias
 Maria do Carmo Gil de Oliveira Dias
 Marta Maria Gil de Oliveira Dias
 Maria Madalena Gil de Oliveira Dias

References

 Os Presidentes do Parlamento (Presidents of the Portuguese Parliament), Assembly of the Republic

1930 births
2019 deaths
Presidents of the Assembly of the Republic (Portugal)
CDS – People's Party politicians
Portuguese people of English descent